Mustafa Güngör is a German international rugby union player, playing for the TV Pforzheim in the Rugby-Bundesliga and the German national rugby union team. He is a former captain of the German Sevens and German XV team. He made his debut for Germany in a game against Sweden in 2003.

Biography

Güngör, born in Aachen of Turkish descent, began playing rugby when he was nine years old in 1990. By his own admission, he plays rugby because he is not good enough to play Bundesliga football.

He originated from the youth department of the RC Aachen. He spent some time with the French club SO Millau and the Belgian team RC Visé in 2004. He then joined RG Heidelberg, playing for the club until 2011. With Heidelberg, he won two German championships, in 2006 and 2007 and made a losing appearance in the 2008 final against SC 1880 Frankfurt. His greatest success as a national team player was the promotion to Division 1 of the European Nations Cup in 2008.

He was part of the German Sevens side at the World Games 2005 in Duisburg, where Germany finished 8th.

He captained Germany at the 2008 Hannover Sevens event where he came fifth in the point scoring ranking. He has also been selected to play for the Wild Titans, a selection made up partly of players of the Wild Rugby Academy, in an international tournament in Hong Kong in March 2009. He was part of the German team at the 2009 London Sevens, and the 2009 Hannover Sevens. He was not selected for the qualifying tournaments of the 2010 European sevens Championship but captained the German team again in 2011, when it won promotion to the 7s Grand Prix Series for 2012.

Güngör became the new captain of Germany's XV on 8 December 2009, after the retirement of the previous captain Jens Schmidt, and played his first game in this position four days later, against Hong Kong. He was replaced in this position in the second half of 2010 by Alexander Widiker.

After a lengthy career with RG Heidelberg, Güngör decided to leave the club at the end of the 2010–11 season but has not signed for a new club yet, with TV Pforzheim and SC 1880 Frankfurt being the most likely candidates for his services. Güngör decided to join TV Pforzheim after the opening round of the 2011–12 season.

With seven and thirteen tries, he was his club's best try scorer in the 2008–09 and 2010–11 seasons.

Güngör was one of four German rugby players, together with Fabian Heimpel, Raphael Pyrasch and Bastian Himmer, who were promised by the DRV that they could join the Sportkompanie of the Bundeswehr, a special sports unit within the German Army.  This was however not the case, with no places available in the unit for male rugby players until 2012. This led to great resentment by the players towards the DRV and its then-chairman Claus-Peter Bach because all four had turned down other options in favour of the promised place in the Sportkompanie.

After finishing his time in the German Army's Sportfördergruppe at the end of 2012 Güngör announced in January 2013 that he would retire from international rugby but continue to play club rugby.

Honours

Club
 German rugby union championship
 Champions: 2006, 2007
 Runners up: 2008, 2012
 German rugby union cup
 Runners up: 2006, 2007, 2008

National team
 European Nations Cup – Division 2
 Champions: 2008

Stats
Mustafa Güngör's personal statistics in club and international rugby:

Club

 Updated 25 August 2011

National team

European Nations Cup

Friendlies and other competitions

 Updated 28 April 2013

References

External links 
 Mustafa Güngör profile at totalrugby.de
 Mustafa Güngör profile at the Hannover Sevens website 
 Mustafa Güngör profile at the World Games 2005 website
  Mustafa Güngör at the DRV website

1981 births
Living people
German people of Turkish descent
German rugby union players
Germany international rugby union players
Expatriate rugby union players in France
RG Heidelberg players
TV Pforzheim players
Sportspeople from Aachen
Rugby union scrum-halves
German expatriate sportspeople in France
German expatriate rugby union players